William George Eardley (1871–?) was an English footballer who played in the Football League for Burslem Port Vale and Stoke. A pacey, quality player he was also prone to sulking.

Career
Eardley joined Burslem Port Vale in May 1894. In the 1894–95 season he only played nine games, but did score three goals. Two of his goals came against Newcastle United at St James' Park in a 2–1 win on 12 April. His other goal came eight days later, in an end-of-season 4–0 win over Crewe Alexandra at the Athletic Ground. He switched to Newcastle Swifts in the summer of 1895, but returned to Vale in September of that year. He still failed to become a first team regular, and claimed four goals in ten games in the 1895–96 season. The goals came in two braces against Darwen on 5 and 19 October.

In August 1896, he moved on to Stoke. At Stoke, Eardley played ten matches under Horace Austerberry during the 1896–97 season, scoring once in a 2–1 victory against Preston North End at the Victoria Ground on 9 November 1896, and was released in January 1897.

Career statistics
Source:

References

1871 births
Year of death missing
Footballers from Stoke-on-Trent
English footballers
Association football forwards
Port Vale F.C. players
Stoke City F.C. players
English Football League players